Slovenia has participated in the biennial classical music competition Eurovision Young Musicians 12 times since its debut in 1994, winning the contest for the first time in 2010.

Participation overview

See also
Slovenia in the Eurovision Song Contest
Slovenia in the Eurovision Young Dancers
Slovenia in the Junior Eurovision Song Contest

Notes

References

External links 
 Eurovision Young Musicians

Countries in the Eurovision Young Musicians